Chile competed at the 1984 Summer Olympics in Los Angeles, United States. The nation returned to the Summer Games after participating in the American-led boycott of the 1980 Summer Olympics. 52 competitors, 50 men and 2 women, took part in 25 events in 8 sports.

Athletics

Men's 5,000 metres
 Omar Aguilar
 Heat — 13:51.53
 Semifinals — 13:51.13 (→ did not advance)

Men's 10,000 metres
 Omar Aguilar
 Heat — 28:29.06 (→ did not advance)

Men's Marathon
 Alejandro Silva
 Final — 2:29:53 (→ 57th place)
 Omar Aguilar
 Final — did not finish (→ no ranking)

Men's 3,000m Steeplechase
Emilio Ulloa
 Heat — 8:29.71
 Semifinals — 8:28.99 (→ did not advance)

Men's Shot Put
Gert Weil
 Qualifying Round — 19.94 m
 Semifinals — 18.69 m (→ 10th place)

Women's 800 metres 
 Alejandra Ramos
 Heat — 2:05.773 (→ did not advance)

Women's 1,500 metres 
 Alejandra Ramos
 Heat — 4:22.03 (→ did not advance)

Women's 3,000 metres 
 Monica Regonesi
 Heat — did not finish (→ did not advance, no ranking)

Women's Marathon 
 Monica Regonesi
 Final — 2:44:44 (→ 32nd place)

Cycling

Seven cyclists represented Chile in 1984.

Individual road race
 Manuel Aravena — did not finish (→ no ranking)
 Roberto Muñoz — did not finish (→ no ranking)

Sprint
 José Antonio Urquijo

1000m time trial
 Miguel Droguett

Individual pursuit
 Fernando Vera
 Eduardo Cuevas

Team pursuit
 Lino Aquea
 Eduardo Cuevas
 Miguel Droguett
 Fernando Vera

Points race
 Miguel Droguett
 Roberto Muñoz

Equestrianism

Football

Men's Team Competition:
 Preliminary Round (Group A)

 Quarter Finals

 Team Roster:
 ( 1.) Eduardo Fournier
 ( 2.) Daniel Ahumada
 ( 3.) Luis Mosquera
 ( 4.) Alex Martínez
 ( 5.) Leonel Contreras
 ( 6.) Alejandro Hisis
 ( 7.) Alfredo Nuñez
 ( 8.) Jaime Vera
 ( 9.) Fernando Santis
 (10.) Sergio Marchant
 (11.) Juvenal Olmos
 (12.) Patricio Toledo
 (13.) Luis Pérez
 (14.) Sergio Pacheco
 (15.) Carlos Ramos
 (16.) Jaime Baeza
 (17.) Marco Antonio Figueroa
Head Coach: Pedro Morales Torres

Judo

Men's Middleweight
Eduardo Novoa

Rowing

Sailing

Shooting

See also
Chile at the 1983 Pan American Games

References

Nations at the 1984 Summer Olympics
1984
Summer Olympics